The Calupoh is a canine breed native to Mexico.

This breed has been developed since the 1990s from a genetic project that involved the breeding between dogs and wolves, which was successful in the cultural rescue of the ancient domesticated dog breed. Rescue occurred due to the breed’s importance in the regional culture. In September 1999, the Federación Canófila Mexicana recognized the breed as a fully domesticated dog breed.

See also
 List of dog breeds

References

External links 
 Calupoh, Perro lobo de México

Dog breeds originating in Mexico
Rare dog breeds
Wolf-dog hybrids